Henry Lawrence (born 21 September 2001) is an English professional footballer who plays as a right-back for EFL League One club Milton Keynes Dons, on loan from Premier League club Chelsea.

Club career
Lawrence began his career with Chelsea, moving on loan to AFC Wimbledon in July 2021.

On 22 July 2022, Lawrence joined League One club Milton Keynes Dons on a season-long loan.

International career
Lawrence has represented England at under-19 and under-20 levels.

Career statistics

References

2001 births
Living people
Footballers from Greater London
English footballers
England youth international footballers
Association football fullbacks
Chelsea F.C. players
AFC Wimbledon players
Milton Keynes Dons F.C. players
English Football League players